An afterhours club (aka after hours club and afterhour club) is a nightclub that is open past the designated curfew closing time for clubs that serve alcohol (which is often an hour long). Such clubs may cease serving alcohol at the designated time, but have special permission to remain open to customers and to sell non-alcoholic sodas and often highly caffeinated drinks.

In Western Europe — specifically in Germany, Spain, and the United Kingdom — 24-hour "music and dance" licences, which do not necessarily have alcohol restrictions, are granted.

In North America, afterhours clubs are typically small venues for professional musicians and entertainers to perform after their main gigs and patrons seeking entertainment after their evening's main event.

Selected after hours clubs 
Europe
 Canteret, Cullera Valencia 1981 (Probably the first After-hour in Europe)
 Chocolate, Valencia 1983
 Spook Factory, Valencia 1984
 Amnesia, Ibiza 1985
 Ku, Ibiza 1986
 Puzzle, Valencia 1987
 ACTV, Valencia 1988
 KGB, Barcelona 1988
 Attica, Madrid 1988
 Space, Ibiza 1989
 NOD, Riba-roja_de_Túria Valencia 1989
 Psicodromo, Barcelona 1989
 Babalu Club, Munich 1990, first afterhours club in Germany
 Trade, London 1990

North America
 Stereo, Montreal

Historic North America
 Macomba Lounge, Chicago
 Catacombs, Philadelphia
 Save the Robots, New York
 Nest Club (1923–1933), Harlem

See also
 Techno

References 

Electronic dance music